Air Leone was an airline based in Freetown, the capital of Sierra Leone. From its foundation in 1999 until being shut down in 2005,  the airline operated regional passenger and cargo flights out of Lungi International Airport.

Fleet
Upon closure, the Air Leone fleet included the following aircraft:

1 Antonov An-28
1 McDonnell Douglas DC-9-30
1 Yakovlev Yak-40

References

Defunct airlines of Sierra Leone
Airlines established in 1999
Airlines disestablished in 2005
Airlines formerly banned in the European Union
Companies based in Freetown
1999 establishments in Sierra Leone